Lost Love in Times is a 2017 Chinese television series starring Cecilia Liu and William Chan, based on Shi Siye's novel Drunk Linglong. The series aired two episodes back-to-back on Dragon TV every Thursday and Friday at 22:00 (CST) from 13 July to 29 September 2017. Starting from 6 September 2017, the series took over the timeslot for The Jin Xing Show, airing on every Wednesdays at 22:00 (CST), in addition to its current timeslot.

Synopsis
Qingchen (Cecilia Liu), a sorceress of the Mages, a group of Wu shamans tasked with protecting the royal family, and Yuan Ling (William Chan), fourth prince of Great Wei, were born with the destiny of the dual stars, which makes them fall in love at first sight, but with their love follows calamity. As Qingchen is the Great Sorceress of the Mages and can't marry into the royal family, at first she attempts to fight her feelings for the Prince for the sake of the kingdom, but in the end believes in their love. When Ling legitimately ascends to the throne, he decides to marry Qingchen despite the opposition of both the royal court and the Mages. Seventh prince Yuan Zhan, who hungers after the throne, launches a coup on the day of the wedding ceremony, and Qingchen uses the Sacred Pebbles of Nine Transformations to create a new timeline in an effort to prevent the imminent bloodshed. The Sacred Pebbles send the sorceress a year before the coup, but in a parallel world where no one knows her and with people who now have different histories, most notably the Seventh Prince Yuan Zhan. Forearmed with the knowledge of the dual stars and calamity, the sorceress now makes it her quest to prevent Yuan Ling from falling in love with her and fulfill his destiny to become Great Wei's greatest emperor.

Cast

Main
Cecilia Liu as QingchenA sorceress residing in the Meandering Skies who possesses extraordinary healing skills. Beyond her gentle and weak appearance lies a calculating and intelligent mind. In the previous universe, her relationship with Yuan Ling caused disastrous results. In the second universe, she isn't willing to make the same mistake and pushes him away. Eventually, she caves into her feelings.
William Chan as Yuan Ling4th prince of Great Wei, and son of the deceased Emperor Renzong. Known as the God of War, he is also the commander of the powerful and awe-inspiring Xuanjia. He falls for Qingchen, a sorceress, who he vows to protect. He is fearless, calculating and self-assured; yet beneath his cold exterior is a passionate man who would do anything to protect those that are important to him. Although Qingchen pushes him away, he still continues to vie for her.

Supporting

Great Wei royal family
Xu Haiqiao as Yuan Zhan7th prince. In the previous universe, he is a cold and relentless man who wants the throne. In the next universe, he is refined, calm and intelligent. He has no interest towards politics and loves nature, arts and music; yet he is pulled into a political war. He is in love with Qingchen and assists her whenever she needs help even though she doesn't feel the same.
Liu Yijun as Yuan AnThe Emperor of Great Wei, a scheming and autocratic man who is especially harsh toward his children. 
Jiang Lingjin as EmpressShe was supposedly poisoned with sorcery by Prime Minister Feng's deceased daughter, Xianwu. It was revealed later that she was killed by Consort Lian because she found out about her true identity.
Zeng Li as Consort Mo LianYuan Ling's mother, a beautiful and scheming woman. Her secret identity is Dingshui, the last head chief of the dark sorceress.
Fang Xiaoli as Noble Consort YinYuan Zhan's mother. A gentle and virtuous woman who doesn't seek power, but is later forced to due to dire circumstances. She killed her own son in order to frame Yuan Ling, but Yuan Ting revealed her schemes soon after. She was eventually banished to the Cold Palace.
Gao Yiqing as Crown Prince Yuan HaoA gentle man who doesn't vie for power, and craves for freedom. He loves Luanfei deeply despite knowing she is actually a spy for Yuan Ming.  
Ji Chen as Yuan Ji (3rd prince)He takes care of all his sibling and is looked down upon due to mother's low birth. He particularly takes care of Yuan Ming and died to protect his betrayal.
Zhang Junshuo as young Yuan Ji
Li Chengyuan as Consort Jin Hui Yuan Zhan's side-consort and illegitimate daughter of Jin family. A gentle, understanding and virtuous woman who selflessly supports her husband despite knowing that he loves Qingchen. 
Ryan Zhang as Yuan Ming (9th prince)A cunning and vicious man who hides a secret ambition. He is selfish and abuses Luanfei's love for him by making use of her. He loves his former wife Feng Xianwu and devotes his life to find out the truth about her death.
Zhang Zheyu as young Yuan Ming
Gong Jun as Yuan Che (11th prince)A genuine and sincere man who knows where his loyalty lies. He is fiercely loyal to Yuan Ling and would do anything to aid him in need. He has a long one-sided love on Yin Caiqian, who eventually reciprocates his feeling.
Xu Jiawei as Yuan Li (12th prince)Yuan An dotes on him greatly due to his simpleness; he causes his older siblings plenty of troubles, but is forgiven and spoiled due to his weak constitution. His actual identity is Guardian of the Magic Circle on Nine Transformations. He shares a friendship with Qingchen and protects her. He eventually falls in love with Mingyan.
Wang Ruolin as Yuan Xi (5th prince)A man who wants to vie for the throne. He is assassinated to frame Yuan Ling.
Huang Haige as Yuan TingThe only son of Yuan Xi. He was used by his grandmother to frame Yuan Ling by stealing his military seal, but he revealed the truth on the day Yuan Ling was to be executed. He and his mother were banished from the city as a result.
Lu Meifang as Zheng TongYuan Xi's wife.

Sorcerer tribe
Han Xue as TaoyaoHead Sorceress of the Mages. Beyond her cold and strict appearance lies a fragile heart. She and Xixie are mutually in love.
Han Dong as XixieHead Sorcerer of the Mages; Qingchen's teacher. He wants nothing but peace, but gets embroiled in the princes' fight for the throne. He raised Qingchen since young and wants to groom her to be the next Head Sorceress. He is mutually in love with Taoyao.
Tang Jingmei as Wu PingtingA powerful dark wizard from Tianwu Pavilion. She sees Qingchen as her deadly rival and creates many dangerous situations for her. Loyal to Yuan Ming.
Zhang Gong as Mo BupingAn astrologer, and the teacher of the various princes. He is secretly an elder of the Mages.
Bao Tianqi as DingshuiThe last chief of the dark sorceresses and the true identity of Consort Lian. She was originally a sorceress of the Mages, but gave up her identity to marry into the royal family. She faked her death while taking her trial. Soon after, she took over the role of Head Chief of the dark sorceresses after the last two were killed.
Ma Chunrui as MingyanQingchen's friend and Taoyao's disciple. She falls in love with Yuan Li after posing as Mo Buping's astrology student.
Ma Yue as BiyaoQingchen's friend.  
Chai Wei as MeiyaQingchen's friend, she is killed by Liang's soldiers.

Generals and officials of Great Wei 
Su Hang as Zhang ShuCommander of Huixia army and the Crown prince's trusted subordinate. 
Hu Lin as Qin ZhanCommander of Yulin army. An understanding man who stands by justice, he later assists Yuan Ling and Qingchen. 
Chen Xinze as Wei Changzheng, general of Xuanjia army. 
Yang Taoge as Li Lin, Yuan Zhan's loyal sidekick.
Fu Jun as Feng YanPrime Minister of Great Wei, and the Crown Prince's tutor. Feng Xianwu and Feng Luanfei's father. 
Zhang Bojun as Minister Qin
Lou Yajiang as Yin JianzhengRight Prime Minister, brother of Noble Consort Yin.

Others  
Huang Mengying as DuoxiaPrincess of Achai Tribe. A valiant and heroic warrior who loves sword-fighting and horse riding, but turns into a gentle woman in front of the man she loves. She loves Yuan Ling, but cares enough for him to let him be with Qingchen.
Xu Jian as Mu Kesha
Great general of Achai Tribe, he's a brave and capable warrior. He admires his childhood friend Duoxia to the point of infatuation.
Wang Gang as FulianchouKing of Achai Tribe.
Gu Minghan as KualuDuoxia's brother.
Liu Yinglun as Feng LuanfeiFeng Qingchen's younger sister. A bright and innocent girl who loves Yuan Ming. She was later used as a political tool in a scheme for the throne, causing her to turn into someone cold, vengeful and cunning.
Xu Muchan as Yin CaiqianYuan Zhan's cousin, she is spoiled and unreasonable, but is actually kind at heart. She loves Ling, but later falls in love with Yuan Che.
Mao Fangyuan as Xiao Xu
Prince of Southern Liang. A brave and learned man who was looked upon favorably by the Emperor, but later becomes obsessed with wine and women.
Zhang Mingming as Xiao Ji
Xiao Xu's brother.
Zheng Yecheng and Li Bo Wen as one of the Guardians of the Nine Transformations
Xu Xun as Lu Qian, Jiangnan's number one scholar who helped saving many innocent civilians.
Yang Guang as eunuch Sun Shi
Wei Yu as Yin Su
Wu Lihua as He Ruyi 
Zheng Shengli as Feng Qiu 
Guo Qiwu as Wei Zongping, responsible of palace rules and personnel.
– as Chai Xiang, soldier of Liang.

Production
The series is helmed by the team behind the 2015 hit drama The Journey of Flower; producer Tang Lijun, director Lin Yufen and scriptwriter Rao Jun. Other notable cast members include style director William Chang, who won a Golden Horse nomination for Best Costume Design with The Grandmaster; costume designer Fang Sizhe (Noble Aspirations), artistic director Chen Haozhi (Crouching Tiger, Hidden Dragon, The Last Supper) and stunt coordinator Cao Hua, who often works with director Zhang Yimou. The White Rabbit Entertainment, helmed by cinematographer Charles Lee (Monster Hunt), handles the special effects; they are the first Chinese company to attain the Content Protection & Security Program (CPS Program) by the Content Delivery & Security Association (CDSA).

The script was completed in two years. Scriptwriter Rao Jun received the help of the original author to ensure a faithful adaptation. Together, they made innovations to the novel, improved the characters and the plot at the same time, and added new ideological contents, along with elements of oriental fantasy such as double time and space. In designing the clothes, William Chang referred largely to the Western Wei Dynasty style. A 30,000 square meters set was built from scratch. It took two weeks to make each of Liu Shishi's costumes by hand, and three months for the twenty different hairstyles; the team also spent almost five months on the preparation of more than 500 armors.

Principal photography officially begun on 24 October 2016, and wrapped up filming on 20 March 2017. The first trailer, titled "Tears, Kiss, Forgetfulness", was released on May 15.

Original soundtrack 

Additional music provided by Jonny Easton

Ratings

 Highest ratings are marked in red, lowest ratings are marked in blue

International broadcast
  Hong Kong - myTV SUPER (Jul 25, 2017 ~ ), TVB Jade (Jun 26, 2019 ~ )
  Malaysia - Astro TV (Aug 14 ~ Nov 16, 2017)
  Singapore - Starhub TV VV Drama (Aug 19 ~ Nov 19, 2017), Mediacorp Channel 8 (Mar 13, 2019 ~ )
 ,,,, Sony ONE (Coming Soon, Sat- Sun 19:15 SIN/MY/PH, 18:15 JKT/BKK)
  Taiwan - GTV (Jun 27, 2018 ~ )
  Japan 
  Korea - Zhonghua TV (Dec 25, 2017 ~ )
  Thailand - GMM 25 (Jan 22, 2018 ~ )
  Cambodia

Spin-off
Seeing the good reception of the main series, and the popularity of princes Yuan Che and Yuan Li, in the middle stage of Lost Love in Times the production crew started producing a side story, which was released on Youku on October 11, 2017 under the title Lost Love in Times Side Story: Exquisite Drunken Dream. The 12-episode web series serves as a continuation to the television series and focuses on the 11th prince Yuan Che and his love interest, Yin Caiqian, portrayed by Gong Jun and Xu Muchan respectively. Yuan Che, Yin Caiqian, Yuan Li, Mingyan, Yuan Hao, Zhang Shu, Yin Jianzheng and the Guardian of Nine Transformations return from Lost Love in Times, together with the following new characters:

 Gong Zhengnan as Mo Qingli, dark sorcerer and Yuan Li's childhood friend.
 Zhang Yang as Qing Bingling, dark sorceress and second chamberlain of the Jade Blood Chamber.
 Zhou Yanchen as Yi Huai, Che's personal guard and friend.
 Qiu Hui as Chen Mu, vice commander of Wei under Che's command.
 Tan Limin as Noble consort Su, Yuan Che and Yuan Li's mother.

References

External links
 Lost Love in Times Side Story: Exquisite Drunken Dream (side story) on Youku 

Chinese historical television series
Chinese fantasy television series
Chinese romance television series
Television shows based on Chinese novels
Dragon Television original programming
Television series set in the Northern and Southern dynasties
2017 Chinese television series debuts
2017 Chinese television series endings
Television series by Hualu Baina Film & TV